Rolf Benjamin Wegner (born 27 October 1940 in Ålesund) is a Norwegian lawyer, civil servant and former chief of police. He is one of the most well known and popular policemen in Norway.

Background
He grew up in Halden and is a son of chief of police and judge Rolf Benjamin Wegner (the elder), a grandson of chief of police and county governor Benjamin Wegner, a great-grandson of the timber merchant Heinrich Benjamin Wegner and a 2nd great-grandson of the industrialist Benjamin Wegner. His father published a book about the Wegner family. He rarely uses the name Benjamin, joking that he prefers people to believe the "B" stands for "Bastian, bank box or something like that."

Career
He graduated as a jurist at the University of Oslo in 1967 and worked as a deputy judge in Horten 1967–1969 and as a junior police prosecutor at Romerike 1969–1972.

He served as Deputy Director of Public Prosecutions 1972–1974, as assistant
chief of police (corresponding to assistant chief constable in the United Kingdom) and education director of the Police Academy 1974–1980, as chief of police (corresponding to chief constable in the United Kingdom) in Bodø and director of the rescue coordination centre for Northern Norway and of the Security Service in Northern Norway 1980–1985, as director-general in the Ministry of Justice and head of the Prison Board 1985–1990, as the first director of the Norwegian Police University College 1990–1992, as chief of police in Bergen 1992–2001 and as chief of police in the National Police Directorate 2001–2010.

He has written several books and articles on policing and criminal law, private law and criminology, as well as historical topics. He is chairman of the board of the Halden Prison Museum Foundation. He has also been chairman of the parish council of Vestre Aker. He has been a member of the council of Halden Historical Festival.

Fagereng case
As chief of police in Bergen, he had a central role in the so-called Fagereng case, in which the city's chief municipal executive Ragnar Fagereng and his wife were put on trial for filing false police reports and for insurance fraud after reporting repeated vandalism to their home. Wegner was convinced they were innocent and tried to stop the prosecution, which generated much controversy. Ragnar Fagereng was ultimately acquitted, while his wife was convicted. The case later became known as a miscarriage of justice, after a gangster confessed to terrorizing the Fagereng family in the 1990s and manipulating the police to prosecute them, and the Norwegian Criminal Cases Review Commission reopened the case in 2010, resulting in the acquittal of Fagereng's wife.

Honours
He was appointed as a commander of the Order of the Falcon in 1997. He received the highest award of the Norwegian police force, the Norwegian Police Cross of Honour, in 2002, after leaving office as chief of police of Bergen.

He received the Clear Speech Prize in 1996, after he had authorized a protest against the visiting Chinese President; when asked if he was aware that Chinese authorities did not like protests, he responded that "here in Bergen, I am the one who makes the decisions".

Selected works
Law and policing
Privatrett for elever ved Politiskolen, 1976
Alminnelig strafferett for elever ved Politiskolen, 1977, 1985
Kriminologi for elever ved Politiskolen, 1978
Ordenspolititjeneste for elever ved Politiskolen, 1979
Politimessig lederskap, 1980
Alminnelig strafferett, 1989
Ordenstjeneste for studenter ved Politihøgskolen, 1994
Politistrategi : belyst gjennom praktisk politiarbeid, Universitetsforlaget, 2007
Strafferett, 2 vols., 2014

History
Mine tippoldeforeldre Henriethe og Benjamin Wegner forteller, 2013
Barkskipet «Dronningen» af Fredrikshald og kaptein Ludvig Bernhard Martinsen, 2012
Oldefar Heinrich Wegner forteller, 2010
Andreas Vibe: «Onkel major», 1801–1860, 2009
"Halden gamle fengsel," in Wiwar : gammelt fra Østfold på ny måte, 2009

References

1940 births
Living people
People from Ålesund
People from Halden
University of Oslo alumni
Norwegian civil servants
Norwegian police chiefs
Norwegian jurists
Directors of government agencies of Norway
Norwegian non-fiction writers
Recipients of the Order of the Falcon